Alejandro Angulo León (12 April 1953, in Erandio, Biscay – 20 July 2014, in Fuenmayor, La Rioja), better known as  Álex Angulo was a Spanish actor who performed in over sixty films during his career spanning more than 30 years.

Angulo died on 20 July 2014 at the age of 61 when the vehicle in which he was travelling veered from the road. At that moment he was going to the filming of Bendita calamidad. Then he was replaced by Luis Varela.
The Spanish director Mikel Rueda dedicated his film Hidden Away to Angulo posthumously.

Selected filmography

Film

1981: La fuga de Segovia
1987: El amor de ahora - (uncredited)
1988: Tu novia está loca - Yuste
1990: El anónimo... ¡vaya papelón! - Evaristo
1991: Anything for Bread - Genaro
1991: The Dumbfounded King - Hombre 1
1993: Acción mutante - Alex Abadie
1994: Los peores años de nuestra vida - Hombre en TV
1995: Sálvate si puedes - Empresario contaminante
1995: The Day of the Beast - Father Ángel Berriartúa
1995: Hola, ¿estás sola? - Pepe
1995: Así en el cielo como en la tierra - Cabrero
1996: Matías, juez de línea - El alcalde, Eliseo
1996: Brujas - Conserje
1996: Calor... y celos - (voice)
1997: Sólo se muere dos veces - Gastón
1997: Dos por dos - El portero
1997: Live Flesh - Conductor del autobús
1998: Grandes ocasiones - Moncho
1998: The Stolen Years - Máximo
1999: Dying of Laughter - Julián
2000: Compassionate Sex - Pepe
2002: My Mother Likes Women - Bernardo
2002: Todo menos la chica - Marco
2002: No somos nadie - El Chirlas
2002: Poniente - Director Colegio
2003: El oro de Moscú - Foto en el ordenador (uncredited)
2004: El coche de pedales - Don Pablo
2004: Isi/Disi - Amor a lo bestia - Conductor
2005: Otros días vendrán - Miguel
2006: Pan's Labyrinth - Doctor Ferreiro
2006: The Backwoods - José Andrés
2007: Casual Day - Arozamena
2008: La casa de mi padre - Germán
2009: Imago Mortis - Caligari
2009: Brain Drain - Cecilio
2010: The Great Vazquez - Peláez
2011: Un mundo casi perfecto - Iturrioz
2011: Área de descanso - Guardia Civil Mayor
2011: De tu ventana a la mía - Sebastián Esperanza
2011: Los muertos no se tocan, nene - Iñaqui Mari
2013: Zip & Zap and the Marble Gang - Sebastián Esperanza
2014: Hidden Away - Jose
2014: Pos eso - Manolo (voice)
2014: Justi&Cia - Ramón
2015: Refugios - Julián

TV series
2005-2006: Aquí no hay quien viva - Pedro
2007: Los Serrano - Julián
2011: 14 de abril. La República - Antonio Prado

References

External links 
 

Spanish male film actors
Male actors from the Basque Country (autonomous community)
1953 births
2014 deaths
Road incident deaths in Spain
People from Erandio